Christian Edward Johnston Horner  (born 16 November 1973) is a British former racing driver and current Team Principal of the Red Bull Formula One team, a position he has held since 2005, winning eleven world titles (five World Constructors' Championships and six World Drivers' Championships). His motorsport career started as a racing car driver, before he switched roles to become head of International Formula 3000 team Arden International Motorsport in 1999.

Early life
Horner was born into a family involved in the car industry: his grandfather worked as purchasing manager at the Standard Motor Company in Coventry, before establishing an agency with Horner's father to supply components to motor manufacturers in the Midlands. Horner was privately educated at Arnold Lodge School in Leamington Spa and then Warwick School. He has two brothers, Jamie and Guy.

Driving career

Having started his racing career in karts, Horner's career in car racing started after he won a Formula Renault scholarship in 1991. He competed in the 1992 British Formula Renault Championship with Manor Motorsport, finishing that season as a race winner and the highest placed rookie. He then moved up to British Formula Three for 1993, finishing second in the Class B Championship for P1 Motorsport and winning five races before moving to the Fortec and ADR teams in 1994 and 1995, and then to the TOM'S team in 1996. In 1996 he also raced in British Formula Two.

Horner moved up to Formula 3000 in 1997, founding the Arden team. According to Horner he set the team up with borrowed money, including a loan from his father, and persuaded P1 Motorsport founder Roly Vincini to take on the role of his race engineer. He bought a second-hand trailer for the team from Helmut Marko, who as head of the Red Bull Junior Team was one of Horner's main rivals as a manager in F3000, and with whom he would later work closely at Red Bull.

He stayed in F3000 for 1998 and was joined at Arden by Kurt Mollekens, who showed good pace and led the championship at one stage. During a pre-season test at Estoril, Horner followed Juan Pablo Montoya through the circuit's high-speed first corner and realised that he was "not capable of replicating the level of commitment" shown by the Colombian driver. As a result, he decided to step back from driving at the conclusion of the season in order to focus on developing the Arden team.

Complete International Formula 3000 results
(key) (Races in bold indicate pole position) (Races in italics indicate fastest lap)

Team management
After retiring from competitive driving at the age of 25, Horner signed Viktor Maslov and Marc Goossens for the 1999 FIA F3000 season. Before the start of that year Dave Richards' Prodrive organisation bought a 50 percent stake in Arden on behalf of Russian oil company Lukoil, whose boss was Maslov's father. Horner bought back Prodrive's share in Arden after one season. Darren Manning was signed to replace Goossens for the 2000–2001 season, scoring one pole and two podium finishes.

Arden also competed in Italian F3000 in 2000 winning three races and finishing second in the Championship with Warren Hughes.

After parting company with Lukoil, a new driver line-up was recruited for 2002, with Tomáš Enge and Björn Wirdheim who were brought in to replace Manning and Maslov. The team took five victories (four for Enge, one for Wirdheim), and Enge won the title that year, but was demoted to third after a failed drug test, handing the title to Sébastien Bourdais. Arden won the Team Championship.

Wirdheim stayed in 2003, with Enge replaced by Townsend Bell. Björn Wirdheim won the title by a 35-point margin to second-placed Ricardo Sperafico. Arden retained the Team Championship.

The final season of F3000, 2004, was dominated by Arden's lead driver Vitantonio Liuzzi; the support of Robert Doornbos helped to secure both the Drivers' and Constructors' Championship titles by a large margin. The team won eight of the ten championship rounds that year, with Liuzzi taking seven and Doornbos winning one. Liuzzi was brought to the team by his manager, Helmut Marko, with sponsorship from Red Bull. At this time Horner based his Arden International Team at Prodrive premises in Banbury, before relocating them to the former 22 Motorsport facility close by.

At this point Horner was looking for an opportunity to move into Formula One. After discussions with Eddie Jordan regarding buying Jordan Grand Prix came to nothing due to disagreements over costs, in November 2004 the Austrian energy drink company Red Bull purchased Jaguar F1 Team, which became Red Bull Racing. In January 2005, Horner was appointed to head the team, becoming the youngest team principal at the time. Despite being appointed only eight weeks before the season-opening Australian Grand Prix, the team got off to a good start under his stewardship, with drivers David Coulthard and Christian Klien finishing fourth and seventh in Australia, and they went on to score a total of 34 points for the team compared to the nine taken by Jaguar the previous year. He also played a key role in recruiting Adrian Newey, who was announced as the team's chief technical officer in November 2005.

2006 was a transitional year: by the time Newey started work at Red Bull in February 2006, that year's car (the RB2) had already been designed, and the team switched from Cosworth to customer Ferrari engines, which overheated and were unreliable. However the team did take its first podium finish at the Monaco Grand Prix, where Horner jumped into a swimming pool wearing nothing but a Superman cape to celebrate.

2007 brought the RB3, the team's first Newey-designed car, and the arrival of Mark Webber and Renault engines, however the team continued to suffer from problems with reliability, with the car enduring 14 retirements and scoring a single podium, while the team dropped down to seventh in the Constructors' Championship the following year.

The team finished a strong second in the 2009 Constructors' Championship with drivers Sebastian Vettel and Mark Webber finishing second and fourth respectively in the drivers' title race, and taking six wins between them. In 2010, the team won their first Constructors' Championship with one race to spare, and Sebastian Vettel won the Drivers' Championship at the final race of the season, becoming the youngest World Champion. Nine days shy of his 36th birthday, Horner was the second youngest team principal to win a Formula 1 Constructors' Championship, Colin Chapman being the youngest after clinching the 1963 Constructors' Championship at the age of 34. In 2011, the team won their second Constructors' Championship with three races to spare, with Sebastian Vettel becoming the world's youngest double-champion. In 2012 the team won their third Constructors' Championship with one race to spare. Vettel became the world's youngest triple World Champion. In 2013 Red Bull Racing won its fourth consecutive F1 Constructors' Championship as Vettel won his fourth Drivers' Championship.

In 2021 Red Bull Racing finished second in the F1 Constructors' Championship with drivers Sergio Pérez and Max Verstappen. Verstappen won his maiden F1 Drivers' Championship at the final race of the season. In 2022 Red Bull Racing won the F1 Constructors' Championship with drivers Sergio Pérez and Max Verstappen. Verstappen also won the F1 Drivers' Championship with Pérez placing 3rd.

Personal life

With his former partner Beverley Allen, Horner has a daughter, born in October 2013. Horner and Spice Girls member Geri Halliwell announced their engagement on 11 November 2014, and were married on 15 May 2015 in Woburn, Bedfordshire. On 10 October 2016, Halliwell announced the pair were expecting their first child together; their son was born in January 2017. Horner is stepfather to Halliwell's daughter, Bluebell Madonna, from her previous relationship with screenwriter Sacha Gervasi. Horner is an avid Coventry City F.C. supporter.

Honours
Horner was appointed Officer of the Order of the British Empire (OBE) in the 2013 Birthday Honours for services to motorsport.

References

External links

 The Christian Horner Fanclub

1973 births
Living people
Formula One team principals
British Formula Renault 2.0 drivers
British Formula Three Championship drivers
English motorsport people
English racing drivers
Officers of the Order of the British Empire
People from Leamington Spa
Red Bull Racing
International Formula 3000 drivers
British Formula 3000 Championship drivers
People educated at Warwick School
People educated at Arnold Lodge School
Arden International drivers
KTR drivers
Alan Docking Racing drivers
P1 Motorsport drivers
Fortec Motorsport drivers
TOM'S drivers